Paul McGuigan (born 19 September 1963) is a Scottish film and television director, best known for directing films such as Lucky Number Slevin, Gangster No. 1 and Push. He has also directed episodes of Sherlock, Scandal,  Monroe and Smash. He was born in Bellshill Maternity Hospital, Scotland.

Filmography
 The Acid House (1998)
 Gangster No. 1 (2000)
 The Reckoning (2003)
 Wicker Park (2004)
 Lucky Number Slevin (2006)
 Push (2009)
 Victor Frankenstein (2015)
 Film Stars Don't Die in Liverpool (2017)

Television

Awards

References

External links

 BBC - Paul McGuigan on Movies
 Telegraph - Film-makers on film: Paul McGuigan

1963 births
Living people
Scottish film directors
People from Bellshill
Scottish television directors
English-language film directors